The 2014 Alaska House of Representatives elections were held on Tuesday, November 4, 2014, with the primary election on August 19, 2014. Voters in the 40 districts of the Alaska House of Representatives elected their representatives. The elections coincided with the elections for other offices, including the state senate.

Overview

Results

District 1

District 2

District 3

District 4

District 5

District 6

District 7

District 8

District 9

District 10

District 11

District 12

District 13

District 14

District 15

District 16

District 17

District 18

District 19

District 20

District 21

District 22

District 23

District 24

District 25

District 26

District 27

District 28

District 29

District 30

District 31

District 32

District 33

District 34

District 35

District 36

District 37

District 38

District 39

District 40

See also 
2014 Alaska Senate election

References 

2014 Alaska elections
2014
Alaska House of Representatives